Roustabout is the ninth soundtrack album by American singer and musician Elvis Presley, released on RCA Victor Records in mono and stereo, LPM/LSP 2999, in October 1964. It is the soundtrack to the 1964 film of the same name starring Presley. Recording sessions took place at Radio Recorders in Hollywood, California, on March 2 and 3, and April 29, 1964. It peaked at number one on the Billboard Top LPs chart. It was certified Gold on May 20, 1988 by the Recording Industry Association of America. The album would be Presley's final soundtrack to reach number one and his last number one album until 1973's Aloha From Hawaii: Via Satellite.

Content
Payments to Presley for each film amounted to between $225,000 to $1,000,000 up front, often half the budget for production, with a 50% share of the profits. These movies were being shot in sometimes as little as three weeks, with the complete scoring and recording of the soundtrack albums taking no more than two weeks. It fell to Freddy Bienstock, the assistant of Presley's manager, Colonel Tom Parker, to ensure that the soundtrack songs fit into the profit equation with the publishing controlled by Elvis Presley Music or Gladys Music, the Hill and Range Publishing companies owned by Presley and Parker. As a result, successful writers such as Doc Pomus and Mort Shuman, Otis Blackwell and Winfield Scott, and Don Robertson lost interest in adhering to the needs of the grind. It was interlocking self-promotion, causing one MGM employee to remark that the movies "didn't need titles. They could be numbered. They would still sell".

Blackwell and Scott in fact submitted a candidate for the title track, "I'm a Roustabout" recorded on March 3, only to find it substituted by a song from a different team of writers. This recording was eventually released by RCA on the 2003 compilation 2nd to None.

Presley and his coterie of top session musicians gamely plowed through all of this, and eleven songs were recorded for the twenty-minute soundtrack LP. Four songs from this album appeared on the 1995 soundtrack compilation, The Essential 60s Masters II: "Roustabout", "Little Egypt", "Poison Ivy League", and "There's a Brand New Day on the Horizon".

Track listing

Personnel
 Elvis Presley – vocals
 The Jordanaires – backing vocals
 The Mello Men – backing vocals (on "Roustabout")
 Boots Randolph – saxophone
 Scotty Moore – electric rhythm guitar
 Billy Strange – electric lead guitar
 Tiny Timbrell – acoustic rhythm guitar
 Floyd Cramer – piano
 Dudley Brooks – piano
 Bob Moore – double bass
Ray Siegel – double bass
 D. J. Fontana – drums
Buddy Harman – drums
Hal Blaine – drums

Charts

Certifications

References

External links

Film soundtracks
1964 soundtrack albums
Elvis Presley soundtracks
RCA Records soundtracks
Albums recorded at Radio Recorders